Ohio elected its member October 14, 1806. Both candidates were Democratic-Republicans, but from election articles published in The Scioto Gazette it was suggested that James Pritchard was the candidate of the Ohio Quids and that in a few counties, notably Columbiana and Jefferson, he was also supported by the Federalists.

See also 
 United States House of Representatives elections, 1806 and 1807
 List of United States representatives from Ohio

Notes 

1806
Ohio
United States House of Representatives